The 2015 Cal State Fullerton Titans baseball team represents California State University, Fullerton in the 2015 NCAA Division I baseball season.  The Titans play their home games at Goodwin Field and are members of the Big West Conference.  The team is coached by Rick Vanderhook in his 4th season at Cal State Fullerton.

Schedule

References

Cal State Fullerton
Cal State Fullerton Titans baseball seasons
Cal State Fullerton
College World Series seasons
Fullerton Titans